Joséphine Pauline Boulay (22 May 1869 – 5 August 1925) was a French organist, composer and professor.

Career
Born in Paris, she became blind at age three. She began her studies with the Blind Sisters of St. Paul and then with the National Institution for the Blind. She was admitted to the Conservatoire de Paris in 1887 and studied with César Franck and Jules Massenet. In 1888, she became the first woman to win a first prize in organ at the Conservatoire.

Appointed a professor at the National Institution for the Blind, she took charge of the organ and composition classes there while continuing her musical apprenticeship at the Conservatoire. There, she went on to win a second prize for harmony in the class of Charles Lenepveu in 1890, a second prize for counterpoint and fugue in 1895 in the class of Jules Massenet, and finally a first prize in 1897 in the composition class of Gabriel Fauré.

For thirty-seven years she taught piano, organ, composition and harmony for young blind students at the Institute. She was decorated with the Palmes académiques in 1899 for her work. She died in Paris at 56 years of age.

Works
Selected works include:
 Petit Carillon
 Andante
 Fugue
 Prelude
 Six Motets à la Sainte Vierge et au Saint Sacrement for voice and organ or harmonium
 Suite for violin and piano
 Andante in E

References

1869 births
1925 deaths
19th-century classical composers
19th-century French composers
19th-century women composers
20th-century classical composers
20th-century French composers
20th-century French women musicians
20th-century women composers
Blind musicians
Conservatoire de Paris alumni
French classical composers
French classical organists
French women classical composers
French music educators
Musicians from Paris
Piano pedagogues
Women music educators
Women organists
Blind academics
French blind people